The oil spill in northeastern Brazil is an ongoing spill of crude oil that has affected Brazilian jurisdictional waters and over  of coastline in northeastern Brazil. The spill was first reported on 30 August 2019. The origin of the oil spill is unconfirmed but stated to not be Brazilian. By the end of October 2019, over 1,000 tonnes had been cleaned up; the spill had contaminated portions of all nine states of Brazil's Northeast Region.

It is the worst oil spill in Brazilian history and the largest environmental disaster ever recorded on the Brazilian coast or any tropical coastal region worldwide.

Origin 
With circumstances still under investigation, the first reports of the spill were made on 2 September 2019.

The amount of oil currently affecting Brazil from the spill has been described as "thousands of barrels". The origin of the oil spill, of a type not produced in Brazil, is still unconfirmed but a  Greek-flagged ship, the NM Bouboulina, belonging to Delta Tankers Ltd is suspected. Investigations by the Brazilian Navy and Petrobras found chemical links with Venezuelan oil, but that does not necessarily mean Venezuela is responsible. The Venezuelan government denied responsibility for the disaster and said that their country's only oil company, the state-run PDVSA, had not received any reports from clients or subsidiaries about any oil spills near Brazil. The chemical tests also determined that the oil was all from one source. Several barrels have washed up on beaches. Prior to testing, the Navy had asked 30 tankers from ten different countries that passed by the Brazilian coast if they had spilled any oil.

The Brazilian government has been unable to map the oil slicks. The oil is floating beneath the surface of the ocean and thus difficult to trace and predict; this also means that floating oil barriers had little to no effect.

Spread and clean-up 
As of 23 October, contamination had reached more than 200 localities from the nine states of Northeast Brazil.

According to the Ministry of Defense, about 5,500 Navy, Army and Air Force personnel have been involved with cleaning the beaches of the Northeast, as have staff from the National Agency of Petroleum, Natural Gas and Biofuels (ANP), the Brazilian Institute of Environment and Renewable Natural Resources (Ibama), the Chico Mendes Institute for Biodiversity Conservation (ICMBio), and the National Secretariat of Protection and Civil Defense; thousands of volunteers have been working at the beaches, too.

Within the state of Bahia a civilian group called Coast Guardians was started with volunteers to clean up the coast, gaining popularity online and crowdfunding money for protective clothing. The group has organized 20 different beach teams. Staff from the local environment agency and some Naval officers helped two beach teams. Civilians in various parts of the region have also built nets to place between the ocean and its tributaries to prevent contamination of the country's rivers.

Impact 

On 21 October, a team of oceanographers, chemists, and state officials visited the Todos os Santos Bay in Salvador, Bahia, to assess the impact of the oil's movement along the coast. At this point, the spill had left a toxic trail for thousands of miles and begun degrading mangroves and corals; this contamination is hard to clean and will remain in the environment for years.

In addition to the risk to the ecosystem, there is the possibility for people to come into direct contact with contaminants that remain in the environment. Harmful levels of contact could happen just from walking on a beach where oil has been in the sea, involuntarily touching oil residue or inhaling the gases released. There is substantial risk for Brazil's mangroves, corals, and marine life as a whole, which will take decades to mitigate, and to humans, as the chemicals can also cause irritation and allergic reactions, especially on the skin, eyes, and mouth. Birds have also been oiled and remain at risk, including migratory species.

To alert the population, the Rio Grande do Norte Institute for Sustainable Development and Environment (Idema), including the TAMAR project, developed educational materials showing procedures that should be followed in case of contact with oil for both humans and animals. The Tamar Project also reported that while adult turtles were being killed, the oil slicks at beaches also prevented the newly hatching baby turtles from reaching the sea, counting 800 rescued babies.

The oil spill also hit some of the most frequented tourist beaches in the area, which received safety warnings from the tourism and fishing sectors by the end of October.

Responses and protests 
Brazilian President Jair Bolsonaro has been seen to respond passively to the disaster, speaking publicly only to pass blame; he first reported Venezuela as the origin, then later asserted that environment campaigners caused the spill in order to stop the government signing more oil deals. He has also been criticized for not visiting the affected areas, and for passing the disaster management to the wider government, with the Vice President making relevant announcements. The Brazilian senate environment committee has criticized the executive for not declaring a climate emergency; in April 2019, Bolsonaro had also closed two committees that were part of the national contingency plans for dealing with oil spills. In late October, Bolsonaro responded to a statement by Environment Minister Ricardo Salles by blaming Greenpeace for the spill, calling it a "terrorist act".

On 22 October 2019, a group of fishermen protested in front of Ibama headquarters in Salvador. Football teams in Brazil found creative ways to protest government inaction regarding the oil spill: in one match, one team wore custom shirts with black patches over their team design, while the other wore black gloves.

See also 
Petrobras 36

References

External links 

Brazilians come together to clean beaches after massive oil spill decimates coast - CBS
Thousands of barrels of oil are contaminating Brazil’s pristine coastline - The Washington Post

2019 controversies
2019 disasters in Brazil
2019 in the environment
Man-made disasters in Brazil
Oil spills in Brazil